Edward Curtis (February 1, 1899 – November 18, 1926) was an American middle-distance runner. He competed in the men's 1500 metres at the 1920 Summer Olympics.

References

External links
 

1899 births
1926 deaths
Athletes (track and field) at the 1920 Summer Olympics
American male middle-distance runners
Olympic track and field athletes of the United States
Place of birth missing
20th-century American people